Beyond My Grandfather Allende is a 2015 Chilean-Mexican documentary film directed by Marcia Tambutti Allende. It was screened in the Directors' Fortnight section at the 2015 Cannes Film Festival where it won L'Œil d'or for best documentary film.

Plot
Marcia desires to break with her family's tradition of not speaking about their tragic past. It has been 35 years since the coup d'état in Chile that overthrew her grandfather, Salvador Allende. Marcia believes that it is time to recover the images of their daily life that were lost during the coup and to uncover the intimate past that has been submerged under the political significance of Allende's exile and the pain of her family.

With a warm and insightful gaze, Marcia paints a family portrait that addresses the complexities of irreparable losses and the role of memory across three generations of an iconic family. Her transparent perspective appeals to the viewer's own intimacy, making them feel like present witnesses of history.

References

External links
 

2015 films
2015 drama films
Chilean documentary films
2010s Spanish-language films
Mexican documentary films
2010s Mexican films